Swan Lake Township is one of twelve townships in Emmet County, Iowa, USA.  As of the 2000 census, its population was 177.

Geography
According to the United States Census Bureau, Swan Lake Township covers an area of 36.46 square miles (94.42 square kilometers); of this, 35.64 square miles (92.32 square kilometers, 97.78 percent) is land and 0.81 square miles (2.1 square kilometers, 2.22 percent) is water.

Unincorporated towns
 Gridley at 
 Maple Hill at 
(This list is based on USGS data and may include former settlements.)

Adjacent townships
 Lincoln Township (north)
 Iowa Lake Township (northeast)
 Armstrong Grove Township (east)
 Denmark Township (southeast)
 Jack Creek Township (south)
 High Lake Township (southwest)
 Center Township (west)
 Ellsworth Township (northwest)

Cemeteries
The township contains Swan lake Cemetery.

Major highways
  Iowa Highway 9

School districts
 Armstrong-Ringsted Community School District
 Estherville Lincoln Central Community School District

Political districts
 Iowa's 4th congressional district
 State House District 7
 State Senate District 4

References
 United States Census Bureau 2008 TIGER/Line Shapefiles
 United States Board on Geographic Names (GNIS)
 United States National Atlas

External links
 US-Counties.com
 City-Data.com

Townships in Emmet County, Iowa
Townships in Iowa